Marcin Zając (born May 19, 1975 in Łódź) is a Polish footballer (midfielder) who last played for Ruch Chorzów.

Career

Club
He started his career at Start Łódź. In 1996, he was bought by Widzew Łódź, participating in their UEFA Champions League 1996–97 campaign. In 2002, he joined Dyskobolia Grodzisk Wielkopolski where he played for four years. He spent a couple years at Lech Poznań before transferring to Ruch Chorzów in June 2008.

In 2004-2005, Zajac had a trial with Rangers in pre-season matches against Roma and Fulham. Rangers won the match against Fulham 1-0 with Dado Prso scoring a stunning overhead kick and triumphed 4-1 over Roma with Prso netting again.

International
Marcin Zając has played 11 times for the Poland national football team.

References

External links 
 
 

Living people
1975 births
Footballers from Łódź
Polish footballers
Poland international footballers
Widzew Łódź players
Dyskobolia Grodzisk Wielkopolski players
Lech Poznań players
Ruch Chorzów players
Ekstraklasa players
Association football midfielders